Kopsia tenuis is a species of plant in the family Apocynaceae. It is a tree endemic to the Sarawak region of Malaysia, on the island of Borneo.

References

tenuis
Endemic flora of Borneo
Trees of Borneo
Flora of Sarawak
Plants described in 1960
Vulnerable plants
Taxonomy articles created by Polbot